The Memorial to Victims of Violence in Mexico, also referred to as the State Violence Victims Memorial, is a memorial in Chapultepec, Mexico City. Its construction started in 2012 during the presidency of Felipe Calderón and it was opened on 5 April 2013, during Enrique Peña Nieto's administration. As its name suggests, it was created to pay tribute to those who had been victims of violence in the nation. 

The memorial is composed of 70 different-textured steel walls, and numerous reflectors, some of which are underwater, project light at different angles. Julio Gaeta and Luby Springall, working through their firm Gaeta Springall Arquitectos, were in charge of the architecture, while Lighteam was the company in charge of the lighting. The creators described their work as an incomplete and unfinished project where citizens can add the names of the victims. Around 40 quotes from historical figures about violence and memory are also inscribed on the walls.

The project was well-received by architecture and art publications. In 2014 the memorial won the Best Use of Color Award at the AL Light & Architecture Design Awards. However, it received polarized comments from human rights groups and society due to two factors. The first was the involvement of Calderón in the project as he started the Mexican drug war in 2006, while the second was its location at Campo Marte, a venue operated by the Secretariat of National Defense, whom acquaintances of the victims have accused of being complicit in the violence. The city government stopped funding the memorial's maintenance in 2021 citing that it was not a priority.

Background and history

Felipe Calderón served as the president of Mexico from 1 December 2006 to 30 November 2012. Days after taking office, Calderón enlisted the Mexican Armed Forces in the global war on drugs. During his presidency, the low-intensity conflict led to casualties of an estimated 70,000 people in collateral damage, with Calderón claiming that the majority of the fatalities were criminals. Isabel Miranda de Wallace, founder of the Alto al Secuestro association, asked Calderón for a location to place a memorial in 2010. Although the proposal was initially ignored, Javier Sicilia, leader of the Movement for Peace with Justice and Dignity (MPJD), and Julián LeBarón retook the proposal in a meeting with Calderón the following year. In 2012, Calderón had conversations with the victims' relatives and informed them of the idea for a memorial construction.

Gaeta Springall Arquitectos, owned by Julio Gaeta and Luby Springall, won the national contest to erect the memorial. It was commissioned by a government organization called the Procuraduría Social de Atención a las Víctimas de Delitos (Províctima), which was later renamed as the Comisión Ejecutiva de Atención a Víctimas (CEAV). The selected space was a 15,000 m2 (161,000 square feet) field at Campo Marte, previously administered by the Secretariat of National Defense (SEDENA), in Chapultepec Park, Mexico City. The Secretariat of Welfare contributed around Mex$30,000,000 (US$2,550,000) toward the project's cost.

The architectural team took props before construction began to indicate where the walls should be placed. Additionally, they contacted Gustavo Viles, the owner and lighting designer of Lighteam, who advised them on the process. Beginning on 7 September 2012, construction was completed on 23 November the same year. Several lighting manufacturers were contacted after the stelae were installed to present their light fixtures. On the final day of Calderón's presidency, Alejandro Poiré Romero, the Secretary of the Interior, symbolically inaugurated the memorial. However, it was not opened to the public until 5 April 2013 during the presidency of Enrique Peña Nieto, Calderón's successor.

Description and meaning

The Memorial to Victims of Violence in Mexico features 70 steel walls; they are constructed of oxidized, natural, or stainless steel, and their textures can be rusted or reflective. According to Springall, stainless steel was chosen for its reflective quality, which functions as a mirror to reflect back what it projects, and oxidized steel was chosen because it represents the scars that form over time. The paths and benches are made of concrete. There is a pond with water underneath the structures. Around 40 quotations from historical figures, including Cicero, Mahatma Gandhi, Martin Luther King Jr., and Carlos Fuentes, are engraved on the stelae. These quotations address topics like violence, memory, love, and pain. The site's facilities are accessible for people with disabilities as there are access ramps for wheelchairs and braille signage plates.

Different levels of color and intensity are present in the LED lighting system. Sources of illumination are located in different zones, including underwater and along the corridors. Different areas, including underwater and along the corridors, have lighting sources. Warm tones are prevalent in low-lying areas, while restrained coloration can be found in higher areas. Several lamps shine light on the gold-inked phrases, trees, and walkways. Since the memorial is accessible 24 hours a day, lighting is crucial when it gets dark because light contrasts darkness and represents hope and life, according to Springall.

The memorial, which allows citizens to inscribe names of victims, is described by the creators as a living and ongoing project. Springall said that there were no names listed because they were unfamiliar with any of them. The Memorial to the Murdered Jews of Europe in Berlin, Germany, served as inspiration for the Memorial's main idea, and the Berlin Wall's graffiti served as inspiration for the idea to let those who have lost loved ones leave messages on the walls. The symbolism of the numbers seven and ten, which for them stand for remembrance and religious perfection respectively, led to the choice of the number 70.

Reception

The memorial received the Best Use of Color Award at the 2014 AL Light & Architecture Design Awards. According to the jurors' evaluations, light conveys a message and plays with subtlety when defining boundaries. For Elizabeth Donoff from Architect Magazine, lights communicate "an unspoken language of healing". Kristin Feireiss, architectural, design curator and Pritzker Architecture Prize juror, said that the memorial mimics nature holistically and engages the community through its "strong physical presence, extraordinary artistic sensitivity and poetic dialogue". For Samuel Cochran of Architectural Digest, the walls call "for remembrance and reflection" and compared them to works done by Richard Serra. Jesús Tovar of El Siglo de Torreón described it as a "simple, humble, sober, integrated and different" work that plays with lights and nature to fill empty spaces. The staff from Expansión gave it a honorific mention among the best works of the year. Vice magazine listed it as one of the Best in Architecture works in 2013.

Nevertheless, the project received negative comments from human rights groups and society members, who criticized the monument's location and ambiguous dedication. Eduardo Vázquez from the MPJD considered it an illegitimate monument that was erected in a military area, and that it did not adequately honor the victims. He added that it was irrelevant because Calderón's will was what led to its creation. In the book Museums and Sites of Persuasion, Benjamin Nienass and Alexandra Délano Alonso consider the monument to be "a façade of participation that is not so much intended to bring more democratic legitimacy or open debate to the space, but to simply relieve decision-makers of accountability".

Members of the MPJD initially requested that hearings be held to determine the location of the memorial and to compile a census of the victims' names, but both requests were denied. Sicilia commented that it would be preferable to intervene and turn the Estela de Luz into the "Center of Memory". Additionally, he likened the memorial to a mass grave. Architect  anticipated the monument to be forgotten due to the lack of social engagement as a "memorial only has value to the extent that it has a meaning". The placement of it in a military facility was seen by the victims' families as a provocation considering how many people were victimized as a result of it. María de Vecchi, member of the H.I.J.O.S. México organization, said that the project is nothing more than a government façade as long as crimes continue to go unpunished.

On the other hand, some organizations had a more optimistic attitude. Félix Hernández Guzmán of the Comité 68 group commented that regardless of the memorial's location, the organization has placed numerous plaques bearing the names of the Tlatelolco massacre victims there. Initially, Miranda de Wallace supported the installation because she saw it as a space for reflection and forward-looking thinking. By 2015, she said that the artwork's original purpose had been defeated because it failed to bring attention to the country's violence and the government had given the memorial no significance. In addition to Miranda de Wallace, Alejandro Martí of México SOS was present during the inauguration; there, he commented that the memorial should symbolize a shared struggle to prevent any further tragedies.

Abandonment

Andrés Manuel López Obrador replaced Peña Nieto in 2018 and established the political platform known as the Fourth Transformation. The platform lists the cutting of public expenses deemed unnecessary as one of its goals. As there were already contracts with private companies, the CEAV limited the maintenance of the memorial to only cleaning and gardening. The memorial was abandoned after the budget for such maintenance was cut off in 2021. Reyna Paz Avendaño from La Crónica de Hoy reported in 2022 that the site no longer has the original lighting, the water in the pond is stagnant, some walls have graffiti or show signs of shoddy work being done to remove it, the braille plates are damaged, and some panels erected in memory of the victims have been removed.

See also
 Anti-monuments in Mexico, memorial-like works installed by non-governmental groups

Notes

References

External links

 at Gaeta Springall Arquitectos's official website

2013 establishments in Mexico
Chapultepec
Interactive art
Monuments and memorials in Mexico City
Paseo de la Reforma